Il-e Teymur (also Romanized as Īl-e Teymūr) is a village in Kani Bazar Rural District, Khalifan District, Mahabad County, West Azerbaijan Province, Iran. At the 2006 census, its population was 163, in 27 families.

References 

Populated places in Mahabad County